The 2017–18 Coupe de France preliminary rounds, Méditerranée make up the qualifying competition to decide which teams from the French Méditerranée region take part in the main competition from the seventh round.

First round 
The matches in Méditerranée were played on 26 and 27 August 2017.

First round results: Méditerranée

Second round 
These matches were played on 3 September 2017.

Second round results: Méditerranée

Third round 
These matches were played on 9 and 10 September 2017.

Third round results: Méditerranée

Fourth round 
These matches were played on 22, 23 and 24 September 2017.

Fourth round results: Méditerranée

Fifth round 
These matches were played on 7 and 8 October 2017.

Fifth round results: Méditerranée

Sixth round 
These matches were played on 21 and 22 October 2017.

Sixth round results: Méditerranée

Notes and references

Notes

References

2017–18 Coupe de France